The Men's Greco-Roman 48 kg at the 1988 Summer Olympics as part of the wrestling program were held at the Sangmu Gymnasium, Seongnam.

Abullah Alizani from the Yemen Arab Republic lost to Israeli Dov Groverman in the first round. Alizani was slated to wrestle the Israeli, but failed to show up for his match even after he was paged three times, in what an Israeli official called a political snub, and Alizani was declared the loser of the Men's Light-Flyweight (48 kg), Greco-Roman match by the referee.

Medalists

Tournament results 
The wrestlers are divided into 2 groups. The winner of each group decided by a double-elimination system. 
Legend
TF — Won by Fall
SP — Won by Superiority, 12-14 points difference, the loser with points
SO — Won by Superiority, 12-14 points difference, the loser without points
ST — Won by Technical Superiority, 15 points difference
PP — Won by Points, the loser with technical points
PO — Won by Points, the loser without technical points
P0 — Won by Passivity, scoring zero points
P1 — Won by Passivity, while leading by 1-11 points
PS — Won by Passivity, while leading by 12-14 points
PA — Won by Opponent Injury
DQ — Won by Forfeit
DNA — Did not appear
L — Losses
ER — Round of Elimination
CP — Classification Points
TP — Technical Points

Eliminatory round

Group A

Group B

Final round

Final standings

References

External links
Official Report

Greco-Roman 48kg